Puppet Master: The Legacy is a 2003 direct-to-DVD horror film written by C. Courtney Joyner and David Schmoeller, and directed by Charles Band. It is the eighth installment in the Puppet Master franchise, the sequel to 1994's Puppet Master 5: The Final Chapter, and stars Jacob Witkin as an elderly Peter Hertz (a character who appeared as a child in Toulon's Revenge) and Kate Orsini as a mercenary hired to confront Hertz for information regarding the magic puppeteer André Toulon used to animate his puppets.

The majority of the film consists of flashbacks using footage recycled from the previous seven films.

Plot
At the Bodega Bay Inn in Bodega Bay, California, rogue agent Maclain reads André Toulon's diary, hoping to find some secret to the formula but the diary bursts into flames. She travels down to the basement, finding a man, Eric Weiss, talking to the last Toulon puppets: Blade, Pinhead, Jester, Tunneler and Six-Shooter. Weiss explains that he knew Toulon before he died, and that he swore he wouldn't pass it to anyone else. When Maclain threatens him with a gun, Weiss takes out a tape recorder, and plays a recording that Toulon left him, detailing how Toulon came to possess the magic.

Cut back to present day, Weiss reveals that his real name is Peter Hertz, the boy who was saved by Toulon from the Nazis. After the conversation, an angered Maclain cripples Weiss, knowing he knows more about Toulon and his puppets' bloody legacy, such as Toulon's suicide. Weiss believes that Toulon only killed those who deserved to die. Maclain, however, brings up the subject of the murders that happened with the parapsychologists. After an argument over whether Toulon was good or evil, Maclain still threatens to kill Weiss. Weiss tells her that the puppets fought a war that was far more than anything they ever known, and then he plays another recording, which tells about Sutek's attempt to steal the elixir formula to kill the Puppet Master.

After the recording finished, Maclain tells Eric that she knows everything about Rick Myers, because before she came to the hotel, she went to collect Toulon's diary. Myers refused to cooperate, so she killed him and took the diary. Seeing one final recording, Maclain threatens him to play it. The recording talks about how there's always someone discovering Toulon's secret, even after his supposed death, always someone who didn't fully understand what a gift, or a "curse", the formula for the puppets really was. After the recording, Pinhead incapacitates Maclain, and Eric fatally shoots her with her gun. Minutes away from death, Maclain explains that's not what she wants, and she tells Weiss that when the puppets brought Toulon back to life, he resumed his final experiment, the one he started before he committed suicide: soul transference.

Maclain reveals that her true intention is to know what makes the puppets die once and for all. She explains that Toulon and all the subsequent Puppet Masters created immortals, souls trapped in wooden bodies, living every day in agony, wanting revenge on their Master, whose title now belongs to Weiss. Maclain dies. Weiss hears something and moves to see the immortals the Masters have created (off-screen). In the final shot, Weiss turns the gun on them and fires.

The film ends with a note: "The producers would like to thank all the cast and crew who have helped make the Puppet Master series a tremendous success over the years."

Cast
 Kate Orsini as Maclain 
 Jacob Witkin as Eric Weiss / Peter Hertz ;Archive footage
 Guy Rolfe as André Toulon
 Greg Sestero as Young André Toulon (Retro)
 Ian Abercrombie as Dr. Hess (Toulon's Revenge)
 Brigitta Dau as Ilsa (Retro)
 Jack Donner as Afzel
 Stephen Blackehart as First Servant
 Sage Allen as Martha (II)
 George "Buck" Flower as Matthew
 Michelle Bauer as Lili (Toulon's Revenge)
 Gordon Currie as Rick Myers (4/5)
 George Peck as Dr. Magrew (Curse)
 Emily Harrison as Jane Magrew
 Josh Green as Robert 'Tank' Winsley
 Michael Guerin as Joey Carp

Featured puppets
 Blade
 Pinhead
 Jester
 Tunneler
 Six-Shooter

Archived footage puppets
 Leech Woman
 Torch
 Totem
 Djinn The Hobgoblin
 Decapitron
 Tank
 Retro Blade
 Retro Pinhead
 Drill Sergeant (Retro Tunneler)
 Retro Six-Shooter
 Cyclops
 Doctor Death

References

External links
 
 

2000s supernatural horror films
American supernatural horror films
2003 films
Puppet films
Direct-to-video sequel films
Films directed by Charles Band
Puppet Master (film series)
Films scored by Richard Band
2000s English-language films
2000s American films